Torsten Stålhandske (Porvoo, Finland, 1 September 1593 – Haderslev, 21 April 1644) – Swedish for "Torsten Steelglove",  sometimes written "Stålhansch" in the Swedish of the times, and referred to in German literature as Torsten Staalhansch, was a Swedish officer in the Swedish army during the Thirty Years' War.

The son of Torsten Svensson (Stålhandske), a noble military officer of Swedish ancestry from West Gothland, and Carin Lydiksdotter Jägerhorn, of Finnish nobility from southern Finland, Torsten Stålhandske married Kristina Horn in 1643. Albeit a short man, he was exceptionally strong; when a captured enemy officer, particularly a Pole or an Austrian, was led into the Swedish camp, he would shake their hands so hard that blood would appear under their fingernails in what he called "an honest Swedish handshake". Hence, his nickname.

Stålhandske started his military career as a squire to Patrick Ruthwen, with whom he had a task of recruiting military in Scotland. He followed Gustavus Adolphus of Sweden to Prussia, as an Ensign in his Personal guard in 1626. In the same year he was promoted to the rank of major in the Regiment of Arvid Horn. In 1627 he joined the cavalry led by Åke Henriksson Tott.

In 1629 he was promoted to lieutenant-colonel in the Nylands och Tavastehus Cavalry regiment, leading Finnish horsemen, also known as Hakkapeliitat, for the first time into the Thirty Years' War. At the Battle of Breitenfeld (1631) they rode with the right wing personally led by King Gustavus Adolphus. In 1632 he was promoted to the rank of colonel.  At the siege of Nuremberg he assaulted the "invincible warriors"  of Austrian Colonel Cronberg and, thanks to his mighty and successful charges, largely determined the outcome of the Battle of Lützen, where Gustavus Adolphus was killed, the battle was nonetheless won.

In June 1634, Stålhandske was wounded at the Battle of Hamelin. In 1635, a major-general, he joined the main army led by Banér. At the Battle of Wittstock he personally captured 35 flags and, at a critical juncture of the battle, forced the enemy to flee. Similarly, he distinguished himself at the Battle of Chemnitz as well as in Silesia, where he defended his positions during the whole year of 1640 against Count Mansfeld.

Finally, in April 1642, he joined his forces with Torstenson's Army and took part in the Second Battle of Breitenfeld (also known as the First Battle of Leipzig), where he was seriously wounded. In May he was appointed general in Chief of the Cavalry. In 1643 Stålhandske followed Torstenson in Bohemia. In 1644 he crushed a hostile army corps in the Jutland, but then fell ill and died in Haderslev on 21 April 1644.

Torsten Stålhandske's mausoleum can be seen in the Cathedral of Turku (Finland).

1593 births
1644 deaths
People from Porvoo
Finnish generals
Swedish generals
Finnish people of Swedish descent
Swedish-speaking Finns